Live in Munich 1977 is a live album and DVD released by the British hard rock band Rainbow in 2006.

The concert was recorded in Munich on 20 October 1977, originally filmed to air on the German Rockpalast TV show. Repeated airings have led to numerous bootleg video and audio tapes of the show being available through the 1980s and '90s.  The set is not from the same tour that produced the previously released live album On Stage (which was mostly culled from their 1976 Japanese tour), but from their 1977 European tour, a few months prior to the release of Long Live Rock 'n' Roll, with a different bass player and keyboardist.

The DVD release also features the three promotional videos for Rainbow's Long Live Rock 'n' Roll album, and interviews with Bob Daisley and former tour manager Colin Hart.

On 26 April 2010 a double 180 gram limited edition gatefold vinyl reissue of the album was released through Just For Kicks Music (Germany).

On 6 May 2013 the CD and DVD were reissued by Eagle Rock and Eagle Vision respectively. The only difference being the addition of 'Rainbow Over Texas '76', a short 13-minute feature, to the DVD, and revised track timings to the CD tracks. Many of the titles on the original 2006 issue CD were edited, cutting almost 15 minutes from the total length of the concert; the 2013 issue restores these edits, making the total running time closer to that of the concert film.

Track listing

DVD track listing
Main programme
 Introduction - 1:44
 Kill the King - 4:42
 Mistreated  – 11:49
 Sixteenth Century Greensleeves  – 8:52
 Catch the Rainbow  – 18:14
 Long Live Rock 'n' Roll  – 8:04
 Man on the Silver Mountain  – 16:25
 Still I'm Sad  – 27:33
 Do You Close Your Eyes  – 15:40

Special features
 Long Live Rock 'n' Roll (Video) – 3:33
 Gates of Babylon (Video) – 6:37
 LA Connection (Video) – 5:12
 Bob Daisley Interview – 21:07
 Colin Hart Interview – 9:38
 Rainbow Over Texas '76 (2013 reissue only) 
 Photogallery
 Slide Show with Audio Commentary - 39:51

Charts

CD

DVD

Certifications

Personnel
Ritchie Blackmore - guitar
Ronnie James Dio - lead vocals
David Stone - keyboards
Bob Daisley - bass, backing vocals
Cozy Powell - drums, percussion

References

Rainbow (rock band) live albums
2006 live albums
2006 video albums
Live video albums
Eagle Records live albums
Eagle Rock Entertainment video albums